Aunt Sally is a traditional England game usually played in pub gardens and fairgrounds, in which players throw sticks or battens at a ball, known as a 'dolly', balanced on top of a stick, traditionally a model of an old woman's head was sometimes used.  Leagues of pub teams still play the game today, throughout the spring and summer months, mainly in Oxfordshire and some bordering counties. In France, the game is called jeu de massacre ("game of carnage").

Etymology 
It was suggested by James Redding Ware that the term was based on a blackface doll itself inspired by a low-life character named "Black Sal", which appeared in an 1821 novel entitled Life in London by Pierce Egan, a contemporary of Charles Dickens. The term Aunt Sally is used for an argument or idea that is easily refutable and set up to invite criticism.

History 
The game dates back to the 17th century, although the name "Aunt Sally" may have been a later addition. It was traditionally played in central English pubs and fairgrounds. An Aunt Sally was originally the modelled head of an old woman with a clay pipe in her mouth; the object was for players to throw sticks at the head in order to break the pipe. The target has also been a puppet, live person, or a simple ball on a stick.

There are also other theories of how the game started. One such theory is that a live cockerel was placed on the stick, and people would throw sticks at it. Whoever killed it won the game and took home the chicken. Another theory is that in Port Meadow in Oxfordshire, at the time of the English Civil War, the Cavaliers (soldiers loyal to King Charles I) were bored and formed a game with sticks and makeshift materials similar to the game as understood today.

The game has also been played outside of the UK; picnic attendees were reported to play Aunt Sally in Australia in the 1880s.

Today, the game of Aunt Sally is still played as a pub game in Berkshire, Buckinghamshire, Gloucestershire, Oxfordshire, Northamptonshire and Warwickshire.

In 2011 the inaugural Aunt Sally Singles World Championship took place at the Charlbury Beer Festival in Charlbury, West Oxfordshire. Among the attendees was Prime Minister David Cameron. The tournament has continued there annually ever since.

On 24 August 2019, the first world championship for Aunt Sally pairs was held in the Bull, Launton, Oxfordshire and was won by the pub team from The Bell, Bicester.
Darren Moore and Billy Craig were the winners. Runners-up were Aimee Sheehan and Christopher Hulme.

Modern rules 
The game bears some resemblance to a coconut shy or skittles, but with teams. Each team consists of eight players.

The ball is on a short plinth about 4 to 6 inches (100 to 150 mm) high by 3 inches (75 mm) diameter, known as the "dolly", which is placed on a dog-legged metal spike about 30 to 40 inches (750 mm to 1000 mm) high. Players throw sticks or short battens, about 18 by 2 inches (450 x 50 mm) at the dolly, from ten yards away, trying to knock it off without hitting the spike. Successfully hitting the dolly off is known as a "doll"; however, if the spike is hit first, then the score does not count and is called an "iron".

Cultural references

In literature 
 G.K. Chesterton, in his anti-German book The Crimes of England (1915), refers to the wooden likeness of Paul von Hindenburg (described above) as  a "wooden Aunt Sally"
 E. Nesbit, in Chapter VIII of the children's book Five Children and It (1902), describes a country fair: "There were some swings, and a hooting-tooting blaring merry-go-round, and a shooting-gallery and Aunt Sallies."
 In the first chapter of The Sheep-Pig, the 1983 children's novel by Dick King-Smith, Farmer Hogget walks past "the Hoopla Stall and the Coconut Shy and the Aunt Sally and the skittles and the band" at a visiting fair. The game does not feature in the equivalent opening scene of the 1995 film adaptation, Babe.
 Angela Thirkell, in her 1945 novel Miss Bunting, uses an old Aunt Sally, which its owner contributes to a village sale, as a symbol of the postwar world's rejection or adaptation of old English folk traditions.
 An Aunt Sally literally going by the name of 'Aunt Sally' is a major character in Barbara Euphan Todd's Worzel Gummidge books and subsequent TV series adaptations.
 In Gunby Hadath's short story "The Battle and the Breeze" found in The Dozing of Cuthbert (1932), the Aunt Sally at a country fair involves a black man sticking his head through holes in a canvas sheet, mocking those who try to hit him with wooden balls.
 Chapter 5 of the novel "The Grave's a Fine and Private Place" by Alan Bradley mentions an Aunt Sally in a traveling fair at an English country village in the early 1950s.

In music 
"The Wheel and the Maypole" by XTC:
"I've got the seed if you've got the valley
I've got the big stick if you've Aunt Sally's head"

In television 
 In Penelope Keith's Hidden Villages Series 3 (September 2016), Keith visits Hook Norton in Oxfordshire.  While there, she spoke to people about Aunt Sally and showed numerous people playing the game. Old footage of David Cameron playing the game was included.
 Aunt Sally also featured on the BBC Countryfile programme in August 2013.
 In the season 1 premiere episode of the UK TV series House of Cards (1990), journalist Mattie Storin – in her first conversation with the Chief Whip, Francis Urquhart – confirms she understands Francis' explanation of how newly elected Prime Minister Henry Collingridge is being used as a pawn and set up to take a fall by calling the PM an Aunt Sally
 Aunt Sally is played in the British detective television series Midsomer Murders in episode 5 of series 4, "Dark Autumn", and episode 1 of series 22, “The Wolf Hunter of Little Worthy”
 Aunt Sally appears as a character, portrayed by Una Stubbs, in the  television adaptation of the children's series Worzel Gummidge, produced by Southern Television for ITV, which was adapted from Todd's books, from 1979 to 1981, and in the sequel/spin-off series Worzel Gummidge Down Under; she is a fairground doll of the type used as a target for throwing competitions but nevertheless considers herself to be of a superior class to Worzel, a scarecrow, and her frustrated suitor.
 Vicki Pepperdine also portrayed the same character, who is portrayed more closely to the Aunt Sally of the original novels, and is Worzel's aunt as opposed to being his (one-sided) crush, in the 2019 BBC adaptation of Todd's books, Worzel Gummidge.

In video games 
 In the Frostpunk expansion The Last Autumn, workers can be seen playing a game of Aunt Sally with a doll in a bowler hat, a reference to one of their foremen.

In politics 
In the Saville Report about Bloody Sunday (1972), Judge Saville suggested that lieutenant Colonel Derek Wilford "wanted to demonstrate the way to deal with rioters in Derry was not for soldiers to shelter behind barricades like (as he put it) Aunt Sallies while being stoned."

See also 
 African dodger
 British folk sports
 PEMDAS (Please Excuse My Dear Aunt Sally), the order of mathematical operations
 Scapegoat
 Straw man
 The Adventures of Huckleberry Finn (1884) by Mark Twain, in which Aunt Sally is a character who attempts to adopt and "sivilize" Huck
 Whipping boy

References

External links 
 Aunt Sally – The Online Guide
 British Pathé video 1963 Aunt Sally at the Three Pigeons pub in Drayton St. Leonard
 Oxford & District Aunt Sally Association
 Abingdon & District Aunt Sally Association
 Banbury Aunt Sally League
 Chipping Norton Aunt Sally League
 Bampton Aunt Sally Association
 The Aunt Sally Pitch

Pub games
Metaphors referring to people
Throwing games
Culture in Oxfordshire